Grace Marie Stanke (born April 30, 2002) is an American beauty pageant titleholder who was crowned Miss America on December 15, 2022. A native of Wausau, Wisconsin, she is the third Miss Wisconsin to win the national title.

Early life and education
Stanke is a graduate of Wausau West High School and began competing in pageants at a young age. Beginning as a local titleholder, Stanke was crowned Miss Wisconsin's Outstanding Teen 2017, her second time competing for the title.

She competed at Miss Wisconsin 2021, where she was a semi-finalist. Stanke was crowned Miss Wisconsin 2022 on June 18, 2022, becoming the first woman to hold both state Miss and Teen titles. In addition to the title, Stanke won Preliminary Talent and $12,500 in scholarships.

Miss America 2023
Stanke bested first runner up and Miss New York 2022, Taryn Delanie Smith, winning the title of Miss America 2023 and a $50,000 scholarship. During the competition, Stanke received a preliminary talent award and a $2,500 scholarship for her classical violin performance of “Storm” from the Four Seasons by Vivaldi. Her social impact initiative is "Clean Energy, Cleaner Future", which stems from her education on the energy crisis. She will spend her year as Miss America helping the country convert to zero-carbon energy with an emphasis on nuclear power.

References 

|-

|-

Living people
2002 births
Miss America winners